Pál Dunay (12 June 1909 – 17 July 1993) was a Hungarian epee and foil fencer. He competed at the 1936 and 1948 Summer Olympics.

References

External links
 

1909 births
1993 deaths
Hungarian male foil fencers
Olympic fencers of Hungary
Fencers at the 1936 Summer Olympics
Fencers at the 1948 Summer Olympics
People from Neuwied (district)
People from the Rhine Province
Hungarian male épée fencers
20th-century Hungarian people